Chamcook is an unincorporated area in Charlotte County, New Brunswick, Canada. It lies between the eastern bank of Chamcook Lake and the western edge of Passamaquoddy Bay.

Local governance is provided by the Chamcook Local Service District,. The LSD assesses for fire, police, zoning, emergency measures, and animal control services. The taxing authority is 513.00 Chamcook. The LSD is part of the  Southwest New Brunswick Service Commission (SNBSC).

Statistics Canada counts the population in the census division of Saint Andrews, Parish.

"Many meanings have been given, but none are certain." (Ganong). May refer to a harbour with a narrow entrance.

History

Chamcook was founded in 1785. Its location on Passamaquoddy Bay made fishing and shipbuilding two important industries to the local economy, though the community also depended on agriculture as did many surrounding villages in New Brunswick.

In terms of rail transport, Chamcook was served by the New Brunswick Railway and later the Canadian Pacific Railway.

There is a Chapel of ease in the area named St. John the Baptist.

See also
List of communities in New Brunswick
List of people from Charlotte County, New Brunswick

References

Communities in Charlotte County, New Brunswick
Local service districts of Charlotte County, New Brunswick